Dagmar Švubová (née Palečková; born August 9, 1958, in Nové Město na Moravě as Dagmar Palečková) is a former Czechoslovak cross-country skier who competed from 1982 to 1986. She won a silver medal in the 4 x 5 km relay at the 1984 Winter Olympics in Sarajevo.

Švubová's best individual finish was 5th at a 1982 World Cup event in Czechoslovakia.

Cross-country skiing results
All results are sourced from the International Ski Federation (FIS).

Olympic Games
 1 medal – (1 silver)

World Championships

World Cup

Team podiums
 1 podium

References

External links
 
 
 

1958 births
Cross-country skiers at the 1980 Winter Olympics
Cross-country skiers at the 1984 Winter Olympics
Czech female cross-country skiers
Czechoslovak female cross-country skiers
Olympic silver medalists for Czechoslovakia
Living people
Olympic medalists in cross-country skiing
Medalists at the 1984 Winter Olympics
Universiade medalists in cross-country skiing
Universiade silver medalists for Czechoslovakia
Competitors at the 1978 Winter Universiade
Olympic cross-country skiers of Czechoslovakia
People from Nové Město na Moravě
Sportspeople from the Vysočina Region